Kramers' law describes the spectral distribution of X-ray emissions.

Kramers' law may also refer to:

Kramers' opacity law describing opacity in terms of density and temperature
Kramers theorem about degeneracy and time-reversal symmetry

See also
Cramer's rule for solving simultaneous linear equations
Cramér's theorem (disambiguation)